Jocquestus is a genus of African araneomorph spiders in the family Trachelidae, first described by R. Lyle & C. R. Haddad in 2018.

Species
 it contains seven species:
Jocquestus capensis Lyle & Haddad, 2018 — South Africa
Jocquestus griswoldi Lyle & Haddad, 2018 — Tanzania
Jocquestus harrisi Lyle & Haddad, 2018 — South Africa
Jocquestus incurvus Lyle & Haddad, 2018 — South Africa
Jocquestus obliquus Lyle & Haddad, 2018 — Tanzania
Jocquestus roeweri (Lawrence, 1938) — South Africa
Jocquestus schenkeli (Lessert, 1923) — D.R. Congo, Zimbabwe, Mozambique, South Africa, Angola?

References

Araneomorphae genera
Trachelidae